Hyphessobrycon columbianus (Colombian tetra or blue-red Colombian tetra) is a species of Tropical freshwater fish of the characin family. The Colombian tetra is native to the Acandi River near Acandí) in northwestern Colombia. The Colombian tetra's habitat tends to be slow-flowing creeks and tributaries.

Only recently introduced to the aquarium trade, it is one of the more expensive tetras.
They will generally get on with most other aquarium fish and will shoal with other types of tetra. However, they have been observed to harass smaller fish on occasions.

Description

Growing to about  total length, the Colombian tetra is silver-grey in colour. It has a turquoise blue tinge of increasing intensity from the lateral line upwards, which becomes a prominent stripe across the anterior dorsal ridge. The fins are predominantly scarlet red but the colour will fade as the fish rests.  The anal fin is usually edged with black, and both dorsal and caudal fins have whitish tips. It resembles Hyphessobrycon ecuadorensis from western Ecuador, and prior to the description of H. columbianus in 2002, the latter had generally been confused with the former.

In the aquarium

The Colombian tetra is generally a hardy, adaptable fish and has a lifespan of 3 to 5 years. It eats all common aquarium foods such as flake food, frozen and freeze-dried foods and small live foods. They prefer neutral or slightly acidic water at around 24-26 °C. The recommended tank volume is about 30 US gallons (114 L). Although they have been known to harass other fish, the likelihood of this happening is greatly reduced if they are kept in groups of six or more, preferably 10. The Colombian tetra can be bred in a similar way to other species in the genus.

External links
 Aqua Article
 Fishindex Species Summary

Characidae
Tetras
Freshwater fish of Colombia
Fishkeeping
Taxa named by Axel Zarske
Taxa named by Jacques Géry
Fish described in 2002